Fernando Javier Hurtado Pérez (born 5 April 1983) is a Chilean footballer that currently plays for Primera División de Chile club Deportes Antofagasta as a goalkeeper.

Hurtado began his career at his current team Antofagasta, but the most part of his career was developed in Chilean powerhouse Cobreloa. In that team he was the first-choice keeper during five years (2005—2010), becoming a club's important player in the 2000s.

His performances in Cobreloa allowed him to be called for the Chilean national team’s 2007 Copa América 23-roster man.

Club career
Born in the capital city Santiago de Chile, prior to moving to Antofagasta Region, he attended to Instituto Alonso de Ercilla where did the high school. Once settled in his country's second region, he joined to Cobreloa youth ranks.

From 2005 to 2010, he played as first-choice keeper for Cobreloa.

In 2011, he signed for Unión San Felipe, but didn't play any game in the year due to an achilles tendon injury.

In 2012, Hurtado returned to Antofagasta.

International career
On 16 May 2007, Hurtado made his international debut for Chile in a 2–0 win over Cuba at Estadio Germán Becker, being replaced for Javier di Gregorio in the 45th minute, during a friendly match played in Temuco. The scores for Chile were of the striker Roberto Gutiérrez in the 40th minute and the playmaker Daniel González — then player of O'Higgins — in the 70th minute.

After a game against Haiti on May 23, 2007, it was reported that Miguel Pinto refused the nomination from coach Nelson Acosta, because he said him that would be the third choice goalkeeper for the Copa América. In the face of that, Hurtado replaced Pinto and join of the squad, being the third choice keeper finally.

References

External links
 

1983 births
Living people
Chilean footballers
Chile international footballers
Association football goalkeepers
Cobreloa footballers
Unión San Felipe footballers
C.D. Antofagasta footballers
Chilean Primera División players
Primera B de Chile players
Footballers from Santiago